Saint Rumbold (or Rumold, Romuold) was an Irish or Scottish Christian missionary, although his true nationality is not known for certain.<ref
 name=2004date1></ref>
He was martyred near Mechelen by two men, whom he had denounced for their evil ways.<ref
 name=CathOL></ref>

Saint Rumbold's feast day is celebrated by the Roman Catholic Church, and Western Rite Orthodox Churches, on 24 June;<ref
 name=OrthEU></ref>
and it is celebrated in Ireland on 3 July.<ref
 name=DvdA-Romb></ref><ref
 name=spdc></ref>
He is the patron saint of Mechelen, where St. Rumbold's Cathedral possesses an elaborate golden shrine on its high altar, containing relics attributed to the saint. It is rumoured that his remains are buried inside the cathedral. Twenty-five paintings in the choir illustrate his life.

Life and legend
Rumbold is assumed to have been consecrated a regionary bishop at Rome. Aodh Buidhe Mac an Bhaird (c. 1590–1635) argued that Rumbold had been born in Ireland. He is also said to have been a Bishop of Dublin, the son of a Scottish king, and the brother of Saint Himelin. He is assumed to have worked under St. Willibrord in the Netherlands and Brabant, and also to have been a close companion of the hermit St. Gummarus, and of the preacher monk Fredegand van Deurne, who, according to one tradition, maintained contact with St. Foillan (who was murdered in the Sonian Forest around 665).<ref
 name=DvdA-Fred></ref>

St. Rumbold's biography, written around 1100 AD by Theodoricus, prior of Sint-Truiden Abbey, caused 775 to be the traditional year of the saint's death. The surrounding areas of Mechelen however, had been Christianized much earlier.
In 2004 a state-of-the-art examination of the relics assumed to be St. Rumbold's showed a death date between 580 and 655.
This would make Saint Rumbold a Hiberno-Scottish rather than an Anglo-Saxon missionary, and not a contemporary of either St. Willibrord, St. Himelin, or St. Gummarus.

St. Rumwold of Buckingham
There has been some historical confusion between Rumbold of Mechelen and the infant Saint Rumwold of Buckingham, who died in 662 AD at the age of 3 days. The latter has become referred to as Romwold, Rumwald, Runwald, Rumbald, or Rumbold. A compilation of three saints' lives as translated by Rosalind Love mentioned that on 15th-century records in Salisbury, an unknown author 'corrected' the attribution as "martyr" (possibly the Rumbold murdered in Mechelen) by annotating "confessor" (fitting in the miraculous infant Rumwold who was not a martyr). Also, the original dedication of churches to a St. Rumbold in Northern England appears uncertain.<ref
 name=TECALSL-excerpts></ref>

Gallery

References

External links

Saint Patrick's Day Saints Index: Rumold(us)
Saints Index at Catholic Online
Latin Saints of the Orthodox Patriarchate of Rome

775 deaths
Belgian Roman Catholic saints
8th-century Irish priests
8th-century Frankish bishops
Medieval Irish saints on the Continent
Merovingian saints
Irish expatriates in the Netherlands
Year of birth unknown